The 1931 Pontypridd by-election was held on 19 March 1931.  The by-election was held due to the resignation of the incumbent Labour MP, Thomas Isaac Mardy Jones.  It was won by the Labour candidate David Lewis Davies.

Result

References

Pontypridd by-election
Pontypridd by-election
1930s elections in Wales
Pontypridd by-election
Politics of Glamorgan
By-elections to the Parliament of the United Kingdom in Welsh constituencies
1930s in Glamorgan